1986 in Japan was the first year of the Japanese asset price bubble.

Government incumbents
Emperor: Hirohito
Prime Minister: Yasuhiro Nakasone (L–Gunma)

 Chief Cabinet Secretary: Masaharu Gotōda (L–Tokushima)
 Chief Justice of the Supreme Court: Kōichi Yaguchi
 President of the House of Representatives: Michita Sakata (L–Kumamoto) until June 2, Kenzaburō Hara (L–Hyōgo) from July 22
 President of the House of Councillors: Mutsuo Kimura (L–Okayama) until July 22, Masaaki Fujita (L–Hiroshima)
 Diet sessions: 104th (regular session opened in December 1985, to May 22), 105th (extraordinary, June 2), 106th (special, July 22 to July 25), 107th (extraordinary, September 11 to December 20), 108th (regular, December 29 to 1987, May 27)

Governors
Aichi Prefecture: Reiji Suzuki 
Akita Prefecture: Kikuji Sasaki 
Aomori Prefecture: Masaya Kitamura 
Chiba Prefecture: Takeshi Numata 
Ehime Prefecture: Haruki Shiraishi 
Fukui Prefecture: Heidayū Nakagawa 
Fukuoka Prefecture: Hachiji Okuda 
Fukushima Prefecture: Isao Matsudaira 
Gifu Prefecture: Yosuke Uematsu 
Gunma Prefecture: Ichiro Shimizu 
Hiroshima Prefecture: Toranosuke Takeshita 
Hokkaido: Takahiro Yokomichi 
Hyogo Prefecture: Tokitada Sakai (until 23 November); Toshitami Kaihara (starting 24 November)
Ibaraki Prefecture: Fujio Takeuchi 
Ishikawa Prefecture: Yōichi Nakanishi 
Iwate Prefecture:   
Kagawa Prefecture: Tadao Maekawa (until 4 September); Jōichi Hirai (starting 5 September)
Kagoshima Prefecture: Kaname Kamada 
Kanagawa Prefecture: Kazuji Nagasu 
Kochi Prefecture: Chikara Nakauchi  
Kumamoto Prefecture: Morihiro Hosokawa 
Kyoto Prefecture: Yukio Hayashida (until 15 April); Teiichi Aramaki (starting 16 April)
Mie Prefecture: Ryōzō Tagawa 
Miyagi Prefecture: Sōichirō Yamamoto 
Miyazaki Prefecture: Suketaka Matsukata 
Nagano Prefecture: Gorō Yoshimura 
Nagasaki Prefecture: Isamu Takada 
Nara Prefecture: Shigekiyo Ueda 
Niigata Prefecture: Takeo Kimi 
Oita Prefecture: Morihiko Hiramatsu 
Okayama Prefecture: Shiro Nagano 
Okinawa Prefecture: Junji Nishime 
Osaka Prefecture: Sakae Kishi
Saga Prefecture: Kumao Katsuki 
Saitama Prefecture: Yawara Hata 
Shiga Prefecture: Masayoshi Takemura (until 16 June); Minoru Inaba (starting 20 July)
Shiname Prefecture: Seiji Tsunematsu 
Shizuoka Prefecture: Keizaburō Yamamoto (until 6 July); Shigeyoshi Saitō (starting 7 July)
Tochigi Prefecture: Fumio Watanabe
Tokushima Prefecture: Shinzo Miki 
Tokyo: Shun'ichi Suzuki 
Tottori Prefecture: Yuji Nishio 
Toyama Prefecture: Yutaka Nakaoki
Wakayama Prefecture: Shirō Kariya  
Yamagata Prefecture: Seiichirō Itagaki 
Yamaguchi Prefecture: Toru Hirai 
Yamanashi Prefecture: Kōmei Mochizuki

Events
January 6: Major snowfall strikes Western Japan. Kagoshima was blanketed with 20 cm of snow.
January 26: An avalanche hit Maseguchi, Mount Gongen, Niigata Prefecture. According to an official report of the Fire and Disaster Management Agency, 13 people died and 9 others were injured.
February 11: A fire broke out in a hotel in Higashiizu, Shizuoka Prefecture killing 24 people.
March 23: Recorded snowfall in Tokyo area leads to a train collision on the Seibu Shinjuku Line.
April: The Japanese Equal Employment Opportunity Law went into effect. This law prohibits gender discrimination with respect to vocational training, fringe benefits, retirement, and dismissal, and urges firms to try to equalise opportunity with regard to recruitment, hiring, job assignments, and promotion.
 May 4–6 1986 G7 Summit held in Tokyo. 
July 6: Simultaneous elections for both houses of the Diet.
July 22: Third Nakasone cabinet announced.
August 2: The first Studio Ghibli film, "Laputa: Castle in the Sky", was released.
August 5: Heavy torrential rain with floods hit the Abukuma River and surrounding area in Fukushima Prefecture.  The Japan Fire Department Management Agency confirmed 20 people died and 107 were injured.
September 6: Takako Doi becomes the president of the Japan Socialist Party. She was the first female party leader in Japanese history.
November 1: According to Japan National Police Agency official confirmed report, seven religious group member burned bodies and mass suicide occurs on beach in Wakayama City.
December 9: Beat Takeshi and his troupe were arrested for an attack on the editors of Friday magazine.
December 28: According to former Japan Transport Ministry official confirmed report, a violent storm hit and damage on not in service train in Amarube Viaduct, Sanin Line, Hyogo Prefecture, total six persons were lost to lives, another six persons were wounded.

Births
January 1: Shōko Hamada, gravure idol and race queen
January 5: Teppei Koike, singer and actor
January 8: Maria Ozawa, adult video actress
January 16: Ryutaro Matsumoto, wrestler
January 17: Yu Hasebe, actress and model
January 23: Yukie Kawamura, gravure idol, tarento, and actress
January 26: Matt Heafy, musician
January 31: Hiroyuki Akimoto, judoka
February 2: Miwa Asao, beach volleyball player
February 10: Yui Ichikawa, model/performer
February 15: Ami Koshimizu, voice actress
February 19: Reon Kadena, model
February 20: Rika Usami, karate martial artist
February 23: Kazuya Kamenashi, singer-songwriter and actor (KAT-TUN and Shūji to Akira)
February 25: Machiko Tezuka, idol
February 26: Crystal Kay, singer and actress
March 1: Ayumu Goromaru, rugby union player
March 11: Mariko Shinoda, singer, actress, fashion model and idol (AKB48)
March 13:
Chiaki Kyan, gravure idol
Kousuke Yonehara, singer and actor (Run&Gun)
March 16: Daisuke Takahashi, figure skater
April 1:
Shunichi Miyamoto, musical artist and voice actor
Yurika Nakamura, long-distance runner
April 6:
Gōeidō Gōtarō, sumo wrestler
Ryota Moriwaki, football player
April 8: Erika Sawajiri, actress, model, and musician
April 10: Yohei Sakai, football player
April 14:
Anne Watanabe, fashion model
Takuya Kawamura, professional basketball player
April 16: Shinji Okazaki, football player
April 20:
Yuji Oe, football player
Yuya Yoshizawa, football player
April 22: Koji Hashimoto, football player
April 30:
Sachi Tainaka, singer
May 1: Ryo Nurishi, football player
May 19: Moa Arimoto, actress and model
May 25: 
Takahiro Hōjō, actor and musician
Juri Ueno, actress
May 29: Kunihiro Yamashita, football player
June 13: Keisuke Honda, football player
June 15: Momoko Ueda, golfer
June 18: Shusaku Nishikawa, footballer
June 28: Suzuko Mimori, actress, voice actress and singer
July 4: Takahisa Masuda, actor, idol and singer
July 31: Hiroki Kato, football player
August 11: Kaori Fukuhara, voice actress
August 16: Yu Darvish, baseball player
August 22: Keiko Kitagawa, actress
September 10: Ryuji Kamiyama, vocalist and actor (Run&Gun)
September 11: Chise Nakamura, actress and gravure idol
September 12: Yuto Nagatomo, footballer
September 14: Ai Takahashi, performer
September 19: Manabu Mima, professional baseball pitcher
September 22: Sayuri Yahagi, voice actress
October 1: Sayaka Kanda, actress and singer (d. 2021)
October 5: Manabu Watanabe, football player
October 6: Yusuke Nakamura, football player
October 7: Mako, voice actress
October 28: Aki Toyosaki, voice actress and singer
October 29: Tina Yuzuki, AV idol
November 20: Kōhei Horikoshi, manga artist
November 26: Kanae Itō, voice actress and singer
December 11: Manami Wakayama, idol
December 19: Satoshi Ishii, judoka and mixed martial artist
December 24:
Satomi Ishihara, actress
Riyo Mori, Miss Universe 2007
December 25: Aya Suzaki, voice actress and singer
December 26: Mew Azama, model and actress
December 28: Manami Watanabe, J-pop singer

Deaths
January 24: Masazumi Inada, lieutenant general in the Japanese Imperial Army (b. 1896)
February 21: Shigechiyo Izumi, supercentenarian  (b. 1865? or 1880?)
February 24: Iwaichi Fujiwara, officer in the Imperial Japanese Navy (b. 1908)
April 8: Yukiko Okada, idol singer (b. 1967)
April 21: Matsunobori Shigeo, sumo wrestler (b. 1924)
May 13: Katsuji Matsumoto, illustrator and shōjo manga artist (b. 1904)
May 17: Masaji Kitano, medical doctor, microbiologist lieutenant general  (b. 1894)
June 26: Kunio Maekawa, architect (b. 1905)
June 30: Soichi Ichida, philatelist  (b. 1910)
July 31: Chiune Sugihara, diplomat and 'Japanese Schindler' (b. 1900)
September 10: Koji Shima, film director and screenwriter  (b. 1901)
September 26: Noboru Terada, freestyle swimmer  (b. 1917)
October 14: Takahiko Yamanouchi, theoretical physicist  (b. 1902)
October 25: Tadao Tannaka, mathematician (b. 1908)
November 12: Fumiko Enchi, author (b. 1905)
November 26: Kaku Takagawa, Go player (b. 1915)
December 25: Hamao Umezawa, scientist (b. 1914)

Statistics
Yen value: US$1 = ¥153 (low) to ¥192 (high)

See also
 1986 in Japanese television
 List of Japanese films of 1986

References

 
Years of the 20th century in Japan
Japan